Acraga citrina is a moth of the family Dalceridae. It is found in Trinidad, Venezuela, Guyana, Suriname, French Guiana and northern Brazil. The habitat consists of tropical moist, tropical dry, tropical premontane moist and tropical premontane dry forests.

The length of the forewings is 9–11 mm for males and 14–15 mm for females. Adults are whitish with a yellow tinge and with whitish hindwings. Adults are on wing year-round.

The larvae feed on Melicoccus bijugatus, Ricinus species (including Ricinus communis) and Terminalia catappa.

References

Dalceridae
Moths described in 1855